Ameerega boliviana, formerly Epipedobates bolivianus, is a species of frog in the family Dendrobatidae endemic to Bolivia. Its natural habitats are subtropical or tropical moist montane forests, rivers, freshwater marshes, intermittent freshwater marshes, pastureland, rural gardens, and heavily degraded former forests.

References

boliviana
Amphibians of Bolivia
Endemic fauna of Bolivia
Amphibians described in 1902
Taxonomy articles created by Polbot